Church of the Nativity of the Blessed Virgin Mary, better known as Nativity or Stroganov is a Russian Orthodox church, located at the Rozhdestvenskaya Street in Nizhny Novgorod. It was built in 1696–1719 on the means of the merchant Grigory Stroganov. It is one of the best examples of Stroganov style, it has the status of a monument of architecture of federal significance.

History 

The construction of the church began in 1696. The construction was almost completed by 1701, but a fire broke out in the temple. The burnt down church was restored by the wife of merchant Grigory Dmitrievich Stroganov - Maria Yakovlevna.
It was consecrated in 1719 by Archbishop Pitirim of Nizhny Novgorod and Alatyr (1719-1738).

In 1722, the church was closed by Peter the Great until his death (1725). The temple was often burning (in 1768, 1782, 1788). In 1807-1812 Alexander Stroganov carried out major repairs. In 1820–1823, Agustín de Betancourt built a brick wall under the church. The belltower was connected to the porch by a covered passage. In the 1870s and 1880s, the church was thoroughly restored by the projects of Lev Dahl and Robert Kilevain.

In the 1860s the belltower start to lean, and in 20 years has deviated by 1.2 meters. In 1887, its upper tiers were dismantled and collected again.

In the Soviet era, a decision was made to destroy the church, but the rector of the church Sergius Veisov (1915-1934) collected historical documents and photographs, read several lectures on the cultural significance of the Stroganov Baroque, and preserved this temple.  A museum of religion and atheism was placed In the former church. Sergei Konstantinovich Veysov was appointed acting director of the museum, and Hieromonk Spiridon became the watchman.

The church was again consecrated July 3, 1993.

On July 24, 2008, Prime Minister Vladimir Putin handed the icon of the Resurrection of Jesus to the Nizhny Novgorod Diocese. The icon was stolen from the church on October 22, 2004. In 2007, the icon was bought by a collector in Estonia and brought to Russia. When he found an icon in the catalog of stolen things, he decided to return it to the Russian Orthodox Church.

Architecture 

The church is two-level: at the top there is a three-apsidal altar, a prayer hall, a refectory and a porch.

The temple is five-domed, they are set in relation to the sides of the world. Initially, the domes were green. Such they are depicted on the painted photo of Ivan Shishkin and Andrei Karelin. But at the end of the 19th century they were painted like the domes of the Saint Basil's Cathedral in Moscow.

Outside and inside the church is decorated with white stone carvings.

The belltower is an octagon on cube. The dome is crowned with a cross with a weather vane. This detail is characteristic of the period of entrainment by the sea. There is a clock on the belltower. On the stone slabs there are Slavic letters that divide the circle into 17 parts, according to the Old Russian calculation of time. The former watch mechanism was repaired by Russian mechanic Ivan Kulibin. The fate of the previous mechanism is unknown. A new mechanism has now been installed.

Gallery

References 

Cultural heritage monuments of federal significance in Nizhny Novgorod Oblast
1719 establishments in Russia
Churches in Nizhny Novgorod
Churches completed in 1719
Russian Orthodox church buildings in Russia